Annabella Samir Hilal (born in Achrafieh, Beirut) is a Lebanese model and TV presenter.

Biography

Hilal was born into an Eastern Orthodox Christian family, and (aside from Arabic), is fluent in English and French. Hilal studied at the "Collège des Pères Antonins" school of Baabda, graduating in 2004, where she earned a Master's in Law. Her ambition is to become a judge.

She represented Lebanon in Miss World 2006 and was ranked among the top seven pageants of the world

The world of television offered to her several opportunities where she worked as an anchor and TV presenter at LBC in two major programs “Mission Fashion” and “Helwe w Murra”. Annabella believes in the quote that says: “After each storm the sun will smile”, therefore she considers that her ultimate success in the world of TV and media was after being selected to join MBC team and to present the leading live music talents show “Arab Idol” Arab Idol, alongside Ahmed Fahmi.

On November 14, 2009, Hilal married plastic surgeon Nader Saab in a Christian ceremony in Cyprus. She gave birth to their first child, a daughter named Mayeva, on August 21, 2010.

References

Living people
1986 births
Lebanese female models
Miss World 2006 delegates
People from Beirut
Lebanese television presenters
Lebanese beauty pageant winners
Eastern Orthodox Christians from Lebanon
Lebanese women television presenters